Cedar Falls is an unincorporated community located in the town of Red Cedar, Dunn County, Wisconsin, United States.

References

Unincorporated communities in Dunn County, Wisconsin
Unincorporated communities in Wisconsin